Jako AG is a German sportswear company based in the Hollenbach district of Mulfingen, Baden-Württemberg. The company was founded by Rudi Sprügel in 1989 in Stachenhausen. Jako provides kits for teams playing association football, handball, basketball, ice hockey and other sports.

Jako has provided teams with equipment since 1989. They began equipping sports teams located geographically between the Jagst and Kocher rivers. Jako is represented in more than 40 countries.

Product lines
Teamline
Football
Running
Handball
Volleyball
Basketball
Basics
Women
Hardware

Current sponsorships
Jako is the official kit provider for the following sports teams.

Football

national teams

Europe

Africa

Asia

  (from 2022)

Club teams

Africa
 Fasil Kenema
 Difaâ El Jadidi
 Rayon Sports

Asia

Europe

Associations
Jako also is the official ball supplier for the following leagues and associations:

  Lebanese Premier League

Referees
Jako is also the official referee kits supplier for the leagues :

  Oman Professional League (Referees)

Track and field

National teams

E-sport teams

Wrestling

National teams
  Ukraine

References

External links
Jako.de Official Site
Heise.de News Article

German brands
Sportswear brands
Clothing companies established in 1989
Sporting goods brands
Clothing brands
Sporting goods manufacturers of Germany
Companies based in Baden-Württemberg